Zofia Czerwińska (19 March 1933 – 13 March 2019) was a Polish actress known for her role in the TV series Alternatives 4 in the role of Zofia Balcerkowa.

Life
Czerwińska was born in 1933 in Poznań. She was the only child of Marian and Anna Urszula of the Czerwiński family. She attended the V (five) High school in Gdansk and was said to be an outstanding post-war alumnae. She studied drama at the theatre in Krakow.

She had a long acting career in film and television taking 150 different roles. She was particularly remembered for her role in the TV series Alternatives 4 in the role of Zofia Balcerkowa. She was active in campaigning for animal rights and to curb homophobia.

Czerwińska died in Warsaw in 2019. She had undergone surgery, against expert advice, and had not recovered. Her ashes were buried at the Northern Communal Cemetery in Warsaw (Wólka Węglowa). Mourners included Mariusz Szczygieł, Marian Opania, Radosław Piwowarski, Teresa Lipowska and Ewa Wiśniewska.

Private life
She married twice but she divorced her first husband because he was unfaithful and lost the second because she was unfaithful. She had no children.

Filmography

References

1933 births
2019 deaths
Actors from Poznań
Polish film actresses
Polish television actresses
Polish stage actresses